Verkh-Katunskoye is a rural locality (a selo) and the administrative center of Verkh-Katunsky Selsoviet, Biysky District, Altai Krai, Russia. The population was 2,723 as of 2013. There are 29 streets.

Geography 
Verkh-Katunskoye is located on the Katun River, 19 km southeast of Biysk (the district's administrative centre) by road. Chuysky is the nearest rural locality.

References 

Rural localities in Biysky District